Freddie Crittenden III (born 3 August 1994) is an American athlete who specializes in the 110 metres hurdles. He won the silver medal in the 100 m hurdles at the 2019 Pan American Games.

Hurdling Career 
Crittenden ran for Syracuse University. At the end of this time at Syracuse he was a Two-time First Team All-American, Two-time Second Team All-American, and a named to the All-ACC team four times.

Championship Results

References

External links 
 

1994 births
Living people
American male sprinters
American male hurdlers
Track and field athletes from St. Louis
Athletes (track and field) at the 2019 Pan American Games
Medalists at the 2019 Pan American Games
Pan American Games silver medalists for the United States
Pan American Games medalists in athletics (track and field)
Syracuse University alumni
African-American track and field athletes
21st-century African-American sportspeople